Antrim House of Wellington, New Zealand, was completed in 1905 for Robert Hannah (1845–1930) and his wife Hannah Hannah (1852–1928).

History

This house was named after the original owner-builder's home county of Antrim in what is now Northern Ireland. Notwithstanding the name or the origins of its commissioner, the house is styled in neither of Ulster's then dominant vernacular styles (namely Irish vernacular architecture and Ulster-Scots baronial). Rather the house is styled to the then popular eclectic mix of Victorian/Edwardian Italianate. Features of the structure corresponded to the earlier tastes for Queen Anne and Second Empire styles, as seen in the heavy interior cornices, the original though lost upper iron detailing and the central tower. The structure itself is mainly of kauri and heart totara, lying on concrete foundations.

Until the leaving of the Hannah family from the residence, Antrim served exactly as intended: a display of not only taste, but also wealth of a self-made man. The central location served to highlight this, while the original garden on the sloping site in front of the house helped to enhance the features and the property itself. Inside, visitors found gas piping, electric lights, and the modern convenience of a piped bathroom. Paired with pressed-zinc ceilings, stained glass lead lighting, and turned features, Antrim House epitomised what was considered both modern and high taste.

With the Hannah family departing the house in the 1930s, its central location and size worked against it. The house had fallen from fashion, and subsequently became a boarding house; a fate that many grand houses in urban areas have shared. During this time, the building suffered its largest ignominy; the fire of 1940. Features that had survived the departure of the Hannahs were now lost to this, and in reconstruction much of its decorative originality was not replaced: two examples are the asymmetry of the originally symmetrical windows on top of the tower, and the oddly placed Art Deco styled arch above the formal stair.

Cultural Heritage
Later the house was owned by New Zealand Historic Places Trust, now Heritage New Zealand. The organisation has both restored features of this now rare town residence, and it is currently their central office. What was once a site bordered by other homes in now encased by Post Modern structures.

The building is classified as a "Category I" ("places of 'special or outstanding historical or cultural heritage significance or value'") historic place by Heritage New Zealand Pouhere Taonga.

Further reading

References

External links

History of Antrim House, Heritage NZ website

Edwardian architecture
Houses completed in 1905
Buildings and structures in Wellington City
Heritage New Zealand Category 1 historic places in the Wellington Region
Houses in New Zealand
1900s architecture in New Zealand
Historic homes in New Zealand
1905 establishments in New Zealand